Steven Fine is a historian of Judaism in the Greco-Roman World and a professor at Yeshiva University.

Education
Fine received a BA in Religious Studies from University of California, Santa Barbara in 1979, an MA in Art History and Museum Studies from the University of Southern California in 1984, and a PhD in Jewish History from Hebrew University of Jerusalem in 1993.

Career
Fine worked as an intern in the Departments of Jewish Art and Jewish Folklore at the Israel Museum (1977-8, 1980–81), in the Department of Indian Art of the Los Angeles County Museum of Art (1982-3, under the tutelage of Pratapaditya Pal), and then as curator of the USC Archaeological Research Collection (1983-87 under the tutelage of Bruce Zuckerman).

After completing his doctorate in Jerusalem, Fine served as assistant and associate professor at Baltimore Hebrew College (1994-2000), and then as Jewish Foundation Professor of Judaic Studies at the University of Cincinnati from 2000 to 2005.

Steven Fine joined the faculty of Yeshiva University in 2005 as Professor of Jewish History, and served as chair of the Department of Jewish History at Yeshiva College.  In 2015 he was awarded the Dean Pinkhos Churgin Chair in Jewish History at Yeshiva University. He is the Founding Director of the Yeshiva University Center for Israel Studies and the Arch of Titus Project.

Arch of Titus 
Fine is the head of the Arch of Titus Digital Restoration Project. The team discovered original yellow ochre paint that was originally on the menorah at the arch.

Some of his work, including his class on the Arch of Titus, has been dedicated to debunking the myth that the ancient menorah from the Temple in Jerusalem is in the Vatican.

Books 

 This Holy Place: On the Sanctity of the Synagogue During the Greco-Roman Period, Christianity and Judaism in Antiquity Series, Notre Dame, Ind.: University of Notre Dame Press, 1997.
 Art and Judaism in the Greco-Roman World: Toward a New "Jewish Archaeology, Cambridge and New York: Cambridge University Press, 2005.  Second revised edition, 2010, Joshua Schnitzer Book Award by the Association for Jewish Studies (2009)
 Sacred Realm: The Emergence of the Synagogue in the Ancient World, editor and author of the major essay.  New York: Oxford University Press and Yeshiva University Museum, 1996, best book in its category, Society of Architectural Historians.

 Jews, Christians and Polytheists in the Ancient Synagogue: Cultural Interaction During the Greco-Roman Period, Proceedings of a conference organized by Baltimore Hebrew University, May, 1997, edited by S. Fine, London: Routledge Press, 1999. Finalist, 1999 National Jewish Book Award, Charles H. Revson Foundation Award in Jewish-Christian Relations.
 A Crown for a King: Studies in Memory of Prof. Stephen S. Kayser, edited by S. Fine, W. Kramer, S. Sabar, Berkeley: Magnes Museum Press and Jerusalem: Gefen, 2000.
 Liturgy in the Life of the Synagogue: Studies in the History of Jewish Public Prayer, edited by Steven Fine and Ruth Langer. Duke Judaic Studies Series.  Series editor, E. M. Meyers. Winona Lake, Ind.: Eisenbrauns, 2005.
 The Temple of Jerusalem: From Moses to the Messiah: In Honor of Professor Louis H. Feldman.'  Boston: Brill, 2011.
 Puzzling Out the Past: Studies in Near Eastern Epigraphy and Archaeology in Honor of Bruce Zuckerman.  Eds. S. Fine, M. Lundberg, D. Pardee, Boston: Brill Academic Press, 2012.
  Art, History and the Historiography of Judaism in Roman Antiquity. Boston: Brill Academic Press, 2012.
  The Menorah: From the Bible to Modern Israel. Cambridge, MA: Harvard University Press, 2016.

Notes

 External links 
 Steven Fine's website contains his full curriculum vitae,'' articles, links and videos  https://yeshiva.academia.edu/StevenFine/About/ 
 Yeshiva University Center for Israel Studies:   http://www.yu.edu/cis/

Yeshiva University faculty
Historians of Jews and Judaism
Jewish historians
1958 births
Living people
Hebrew University of Jerusalem alumni
University of Southern California alumni
University of California, Santa Barbara alumni